The Cameron River Volcanic Belt is a Neoarchean volcanic belt near the Cameron River in the Northwest Territories, Canada. It contains pillow lavas about 2,600 million years old, indicating that great oceanic volcanoes existed during the early stages of the formation of the Earth's crust.

See also
List of volcanoes in Canada
Volcanism of Canada
Volcanism of Northern Canada

Volcanism of the Northwest Territories
Volcanic belts